Tichitt Airport  is an airport serving the town of Tichit in Mauritania. Runway boundaries are marked in white on dark rock or dirt; are otherwise difficult to discern.

See also

Transport in Mauritania
List of airports in Mauritania

References

External links
 OurAirports - Mauritania
  Great Circle Mapper - Tichit
 Tichit

Airports in Mauritania